Guillaume de Sax (1889–1945) was a Belgian actor.

De Sax was born Guillaume Henri Robert de Segur Lamoignon in Belgium and died in France. He was married to the actress Cécile Sorel.

Partial filmography
 Ernest the Rebel (1938)
 Three Waltzes (1938)
 I Was an Adventuress (1938)
 Coral Reefs (1939)
 Immediate Call (1939)
 Angelica (1939)
 Cristobal's Gold (1940)
 Miss Bonaparte (1942)
 L'amant de Bornéo (1942)
 Strange Inheritance (1943)
 La Main du diable (1943)
 Vautrin (1943)
Farandole (1945)
 The Eleventh Hour Guest (1945)

Bibliography
 Waldman, Harry. Maurice Tourneur: The Life and Films. McFarland & Co, 2008.

External links

Photograph of Guillaume de Sax from BlogSpot (copyright status unknown)

1889 births
1945 deaths
Belgian male film actors
20th-century Belgian male actors